Professor Akintola Josephus Gustavus Wyse was an ethnic Sierra Leone Creole and Professor of History at Fourah Bay College in Freetown, Sierra Leone, until his death in October 2002. Wyse was the author of H.C. Bankole-Bright and Politics in Colonial Sierra Leone 1919-1958 (Cambridge University Press, 2003) and The Krio of Sierra Leone: An Interpretive History (Hurst and International African Institute, 1989). He also chaired the Public Services Commission of Sierra Leone until his death.

References

External links

Year of birth missing
2002 deaths
Sierra Leone Creole people
Sierra Leone Creole historians
Historians of Sierra Leone
Fourah Bay College alumni
Academic staff of Fourah Bay College